Waddington Channel is a strait located between East Redonda and West Redonda Island of the Discovery Islands in British Columbia, Canada.

Geography
Waddington Channel connects Desolation Sound to the south with Pryce Channel to the north. Pendrell Sound branches off of the main channel to the northeast, deeply incising West Redonda Island.

The channel contains two major islands: Allies Island and Elworthy Island.

Hydrology
The northern hydrological limit of Waddington Channel delineates part of the northern limit of the Salish Sea.

Conservation
Notable provincial parks and protected located within Waddington Channel include:
East Redonda Island Ecological Reserve
Roscoe Bay Provincial Park
Walsh Cove Provincial Park

See also
Lewis Channel
Homfray Channel

References

Central Coast of British Columbia
Landforms of the Discovery Islands
Channels of British Columbia
Salish Sea